Mystic Mountain is a 2015 Tibetan-language film written and directed by Tsering Dhundup.

This is a psychological thriller set in a mysterious Himalayan village. The protagonist is a young Tibetan who goes on a quest for his father's missing body.

References

See also
 Mystic Mountain (Hubble Space Telescope 25th anniversary image released in 2010)

Tibetan-language films
Films about Tibet
2015 films
Psychological thriller films